Streamers is a 1983 film adapted by David Rabe from his play of the same name. The film was directed by Robert Altman and produced by Robert Michael Geisler and John Roberdeau, who later produced The Thin Red Line. The cast includes David Alan Grier as Roger, Mitchell Lichtenstein as Richie, Matthew Modine as Billy, Michael Wright as Carlyle, George Dzundza as Cokes, and Guy Boyd as Rooney.

The entire cast was named Best Actor at the Venice Film Festival. The film was screened out of competition at the 1983 Cannes Film Festival.

Premise
In 1965, four young soldiers waiting to be shipped to Vietnam deal with racial tension and their own intolerance when one soldier reveals he is gay.

Cast

Production
Altman financed the film himself without a distribution deal, which allowed him to cast an ensemble of experienced but relatively unknown actors rather than rely on a bankable star as studios typically demanded. The film was shot in Dallas in 18 days.

Release
Streamers premiered at the Toronto International Film Festival on September 16, 1983. The film was later released onto DVD by Shout! Factory on January 19, 2010.

Reception
Roger Ebert gave the film four stars out of four, calling it "one of the most intense and intimate dramas I've ever seen on film," adding, "Watching this film is such a demanding experience that both times I've seen it, it has been too much for some viewers, and they've left. Those who stay, who survive the difficult passages of violence, will find at the end of the film a conclusion that is so poetic and moving it succeeds in placing the tragedy in perspective." Gene Siskel awarded three-and-a-half stars out of four and called it "a powerful piece of American theater made even more striking on screen," declaring that it also "represents the return of Altman the director, for here is a play one could hand to a dozen directors and you would not see a better, more personal work." Vincent Canby of The New York Times was less positive, writing that the film "goes partway toward realizing the full effect of a stage play as a film, then botches the job by the overabundant use of film techniques, which dismember what should be an ensemble performance." Sheila Benson of the Los Angeles Times called the film "a punishing place to be in, but a brilliant and thought-provoking movie experience." Jack Kroll of Newsweek wrote, "Altman sends his camera into the barracks like an invisible eavesdropper, appalled at what he sees but insisting on seeing it with punishing clarity. The nonstar cast is tremendous, especially Wright as the soldier who triggers a civil war within this troubled Army of a troubled society."

References

External links
 
 
 

1983 films
1983 drama films
1983 LGBT-related films
American films based on plays
American LGBT-related films
1980s English-language films
Films about race and ethnicity
Films directed by Robert Altman
Films shot in Texas
Gay-related films
United Artists films
Vietnam War films
Homophobia in fiction
Films about anti-LGBT sentiment
LGBT-related drama films
1980s American films